Le Palio, or Salle des sports du Palio, is an indoor sports arena that is located in Boulazac, Périgueux, Dordogne, France. It is used to host sports competitions and concerts. The arena has a seating capacity of 5,200 people for basketball games.

History
The arena was originally opened in the year 2008. The arena has been used as the home arena of the professional basketball team, Boulazac Basket Dordogne, since 2008. In December 2011, the arena's seating capacity for basketball games was increased to 5,200.

On November 12, 2015, CSP Limoges used the arena to host a Euroleague 2015–16 season game against Olimpia Milano.

References

External links
Le Palio (Boulazac) Official Website 
Image 1 of Le Palio (Boulazac) Interior
Image 2 of Le Palio (Boulazac) Interior

Basketball venues in France
Indoor arenas in France
Sports venues completed in 2008
Sports venues in Dordogne
21st-century architecture in France